Cengiling is a village on the south coast of Bali, Indonesia. It lies to the west of Jimbaran. On top of the hill between Cengiling and Balangan there were plans to construct a large monument of Garuda Wisnu Kencana which would become one of the world's tallest at 125 metres.

References

Populated places in Bali
Surfing locations in Indonesia